From Beirut to Jerusalem: A Woman Surgeon with the Palestinians  is a book by Swee Chai Ang, an orthopaedic surgeon who worked with civilians during the Lebanese Civil War. The book details her eye-witness account of the Sabra and Shatila massacre. Dr. Ang, a graduate of the Royal Victoria Infirmary in Britain, testified before the Kahan Commission. The commission was responsible for investigating the nature of the Israeli involvement in the massacre of perhaps 800 to 1000 Palestinians. Dr. Ang established a British charity following her first hand account of the massacres known as the Medical Aid for Palestinians (MAP) which she discusses in her work.

References

External  links
From Beirut to Jerusalem, by Ang Swee Chai
1989 non-fiction books
Books about physicians